Frederick Haskell Dominick, (February 20, 1877 – March 11, 1960) was elected to the U.S. House of Representatives for South Carolina's 3rd congressional district. He served for eight terms from 1917 to 1933.

Biography

He was born in Peak in Newberry County, South Carolina on February 20, 1877. He attended the public schools of Columbia, South Carolina, Newberry College, South Carolina College in Columbia and the law school of the University of Virginia in Charlottesville. He was admitted to the South Carolina bar in 1898 and commenced practice in Newberry, South Carolina. He was a member of the South Carolina House of Representatives from 1901 to 1902. He was a chairman of the Democratic Party county committee from 1906 to 1914. He served as an assistant attorney general of South Carolina from 1913 to 1916.  He was a delegate to the Democratic National Conventions in 1920 and 1924. He was elected to the Sixty-fifth and to the seven succeeding Congresses (March 4, 1917 to March 3, 1933). On April 5, 1917, he was one of 50 representatives who voted against declaring war on Germany, the only person in Congress from South Carolina to so vote. He was an unsuccessful candidate for renomination in 1932. In Congress, he was one of the managers appointed by the United States House of Representatives in 1926 to conduct the impeachment proceedings against George W. English, who was a judge of the United States District Court for the Eastern District of Illinois. During the Second World War, he served as an assistant to the United States Attorney General of the Department of Justice in Washington, D.C. He practiced law in Newberry, South Carolina until his death there March 11, 1960. He was interred in Rosemont Cemetery.

External links
 Congressional biography

1877 births
1960 deaths
Newberry College alumni
University of South Carolina alumni
University of Virginia School of Law alumni
American Lutherans
Democratic Party members of the United States House of Representatives from South Carolina
People from Newberry County, South Carolina
People from Newberry, South Carolina